Le Bonnet Rouge was as an anarchist French newspaper published from 1913 to 1922. Le Bonnet Rouge defended before the Great War the Franco-German rapprochement.

The newspaper's administrator, Émile-Joseph Duval, was arrested, tried and executed on 7 August 1917 over allegations of complicity with the enemy, Germany, in the midst of World War I.

References

1913 establishments in France
1922 disestablishments in France
Anarchist periodicals published in France
People executed by France by firing squad
Executed French people
People executed for treason against France
Defunct newspapers published in France